Boil is a live album by Foetus released in 1996.  Boil is culled from Foetus' Rednecropolis 96 European tour.

Track listing
All songs by J. G. Thirlwell, except where noted.
"Take It Outside Godboy"  – 3:04
"Clothes Hoist"  – 3:17
"Verklemmt"  – 4:29
"I'll Meet You in Poland Baby"  – 6:06
"I Am the Walrus" (Lennon/McCartney)  – 7:08
"They Are Not So True"  – 4:25
"Hot Horse"  – 4:18
"Mortgage"  – 5:59
"Mighty Whity"  – 3:57
"Elected" (A. Cooper/M. Bruce/G. Buxton/D. Dunaway/N. Smith)  – 7:37
"Sonic Reducer" (Chrome/Thomas) – 4:48
"Hello There" (Rick Nielsen) – 2:23

All songs not written by Thirlwell are covers.

Personnel
J. G. Thirlwell - Master of Disaster, vocals
Brian Emrich - Bass
William Tucker -  Guitar
Rob "Rok" Sutton - Keyboard, guitar
Kurt Wolf - Guitar
Jim Kimball - drums

Production
J. G. Thirlwell - Remastering
Rob Sutton - Remastering
Kurt Wolf - Remastering
Andy Ray - Live sound

External links
Boil at foetus.org

Foetus (band) albums
1996 live albums
Cleopatra Records live albums